Robert Michael Boetticher Sr. (born August 23, 1946) is an American funeral director, best known for the planning and implementation of memorial services for celebrities and notable individuals. He was the lead funeral director and embalmer for the state funerals of George H. W. Bush, Gerald Ford and Ronald Reagan, and has coordinated and directed some with the assistance of the members of the SCI Ceremonial Funeral Team of the most visible funerals in recent history.

With a career spanning nearly five decades, Boetticher has become a renowned figure in the death care industry. He is currently the AVP to the Founder and Chairman Emeritus of Service Corporation International, President and CEO of LHT Consulting Group, and Member of Ceremonial Funeral Team. He is also a nationally known speaker and lecturer, movie and television consultant, and a contributing writer for industry publications.

Early life 

Boetticher was born in Santa Monica, California to Henry Edward Boetticher,(1924 – 2004), an entrepreneur, and Patricia Jean Boetticher (1923 - 2011), a homemaker and community volunteer. Boetticher and his older brother, William Edward (1944 - ), were raised in Brentwood, a suburb of Los Angeles.

Boetticher knew from an early age that he wanted to pursue a career in funeral service. He graduated high school from Army and Navy Academy in Carlsbad, California in 1965, then later enrolled at the California College of Mortuary Science to become a licensed embalmer and funeral director.

Military service 

During the Vietnam War, Boetticher was drafted by the U.S. Army and was forced to leave his studies at the mortuary college as well as positions with a local funeral home Armstrong Family Mortuary and Goodhew Ambulance Company in Los Angeles, California . He was sent to Fort Polk, Louisiana for Basic Training and then made the decision to enlist for an additional year to attend the U.S. Army's Grave Registration School at Army Mortuary System Europe in Prince George County, Virginia.

After completion of Grave Reservation School in 1966, Boetticher received orders to be assigned to an Infantry Regiment and then transferred to a Medic Mobilized Unit in Augsburg, Germany.  Being a funeral director and apprentice embalmer, he was then reassigned to the Army Mortuary Affairs System Europe in Frankfurt, Germany, where he served as a supply sergeant and embalmer. Boetticher was honorably discharged in 1970 as a Sergeant First Class, but remained in Frankfurt, working for the U.S. Army PX system until his return to United States in 1970 with his wife and son Bob, Jr.

Career 

After his return to the Santa Monica, California in 1970, Boetticher wanted to explore a career in the film industry working alongside his uncle, Budd Boetticher (1916-2001), a well-known movie director. But in need of steady employment for his growing family, he turned back to his lifelong ambitions in funeral service. He accepted a job at Gates Kingsley & Gates Mortuary in Santa Monica, California as an embalmer and funeral director. The firm was owned by Mark Gates and Virgle Kingsley and was acquired by SCI shortly thereafter in 1970, marking Boetticher's first position with the funeral service giant. He then graduated from the California College of Mortuary Science now known as Cypress College in 1971.

In 1974, Boetticher and his wife, Jarka, purchased a funeral home and flower shop in Jackson Hole, Wyoming, where he was elected Teton County Coroner, for Teton County, Jackson Hole, Wyoming, Teton National Park, and Yellowstone National Park. He was a founding member of the Wyoming Coroner's Association who was the force behind the development of the Coroner Basic Course at the Wyoming Law Enforcement Acadeny now mandated by Wyoming State Statute.  Boetticher was a member of the International Association of Coroners and Medical Examiners. He went on to later purchase three other funeral homes throughout Wyoming and also held offices and received awards in local, national and state organizations.

In 1983, he rejoined SCI and relocated to Kansas City, Missouri, where he served in a variety of field funeral and cemetery operations and also served on the board of directors of the Kansas City Kansas Community College – Mortuary Science. He relocated to SCI headquarters in Houston, Texas in 1991, heading several departments and was temporarily reassigned to London, England in 1994 to assist with the company's merchandising efforts with newly acquired funeral homes. Boetticher's work has also contributed to technological innovations in death care. As concerns began to mount surrounding the safety of funeral professionals involved in embalming procedures, Boetticher worked as Project Manager for the research and development of a new embalming fluid, Infinity 2000, a phenol- and formaldehyde-free fluid that required no special safety precautions and was non-irritating to the embalmer's eyes and skin. Infinity 2000 also, unlike formaldehyde, allows organs to retain their natural color, which is of use in teaching at medical schools.

Since 1993, Boetticher has been Vice-Chairman/CEO and on May 22, 2018 was elected Chairman of the Board of the National Museum of Funeral History, a 35,000 sq. ft. facility located in Houston which houses the country's largest collection of funeral service artifacts. He has also served as Vice-Chairman of the Board of Regents for the Commonwealth Institute of Funeral Service since 1993. In 2014, Boetticher became President of The Heritage Club - National Funeral Director's Association, a charitable group that funds and supports educational endeavors in the funeral service industry.

Boetticher is a familiar speaker on the History of Presidential State Funerals at industry conferences and events, with past appearances at the Wilbert, Inc. annual meeting in Santa Fe, NM in 1996; the Tri State Funeral Directors Convention in Kansas City, MO in 2005; the New York Funeral Directors Convention in Saratoga, NY in 2011; the South Carolina Funeral Directors Association Mid-Winter Conference & Expo in Columbia, SC in 2012; the Rochester Funeral Directors Meeting in Rochester, NY in 2013; the Southern Funeral Service Expo in Macon, GA, the Oklahoma Funeral Directors Convention in Tulsa, OK, and the Erie-Niagara Funeral Directors association in Amherst, NY in 2015. In 2016, Boetticher spoke at the Idaho Funeral Service Association Convention in McCall, ID; appeared twice in engagements at the Cincinnati College of Mortuary Science in Cincinnati, OH, including delivery of the commencement address; and was also a featured speaker at the Southeastern Family Office Forum in Atlanta, GA, presenting on the topic, "Preparing for the Inevitable: The role of the family office when there is a death.” In 2017, Boetticher spoke to the Funeral Directors of Kentucky in Louisville, KY and Alabama Funeral Directors in Mobile, Alabama. In January, 2019 he spoke to the Society of Former Special Agents of the FBI in Houston, Texas, the Cincinnati College of Mortuary Science, Cincinniti, Ohio in February 2019. He spoke in May 2019 at the 139th Annual Convention of the Indiana Funeral Directors Association Convention and in June, 2019 at the 139th Ohio Funeral Directors Association Convention in Columbus, Ohio and the Louisiana and Mississippi joint Funeral Directors Convention, New Orleans, LA.
He made a presentation on state funerals at the Georgia Funeral Directors Association on June 11, 2019.

In print media, Boetticher has written articles Southern Calls and American Funeral Director Magazines.  

Boetticher has also had consulting assignments for  museums, production companies, radio programs and feature films, including Gangs of New York and A Woman of Independent Means. His television credits include work on Six Feet Under, the History Channel and the Discovery Channel.

Personal life 

Boetticher is married to Jaroslava Rydlova Boetticher for the past 50 years, a Czech-born physical therapist, whom he met in Germany during his service with the U.S. Army. They currently reside in Houston, Texas and have three children, Robert M. Boetticher Jr. (1970), Keven H. Boetticher (1975) and John P. Boetticher (1978).

References 

1946 births
Living people
American funeral directors
People from Santa Monica, California
United States Army soldiers
American military personnel of the Vietnam War